The 1877 Grand National was the 39th renewal of the Grand National horse race that took place at Aintree near Liverpool, England, on 23 March 1877.

Finishing Order

Non-finishers

References

 1877
Grand National
Grand National
19th century in Lancashire